Binocular may refer to:

Science and technology
 Binocular vision, seeing with two eyes
 Binoculars, a telescopic tool
 Binocular microscope, binocular viewing of objects through a single objective lens

Other uses
 Binocular (horse), a thoroughbred race horse
 Binocular (band), Kevin Rudolf's band that released a self-titled album in 2001
 Binocular (album)

See also
 Binocular rivalry, a phenomenon of visual perception
 Binoviewer, an optical device designed to enable binocular viewing through a single objective